The Renault Trucks K is a range of heavy-duty trucks for construction introduced in 2013 by the French truckmaker Renault Trucks.

Characteristics
The Renault Trucks K incorporates an all-wheel drive system as well as security and comfort improvements. The maximum gross combined weight is 120 tonnes.

Engines
The  K offers two Euro 6 six-cylinder engines, the 11 L DTI 11 (with a power output of 380, 430 and 460hp) and the 13 L DTI 13 (440, 480 and 520hp).

References

K
Vehicles introduced in 2013